Pär-Olov Arnold Olsson (born 8 January 1954), better known as Pär-Olof Ohlsson, is a Swedish former professional footballer who played as a striker. Starting his career with Varbergs BoIS in 1970, he went on to represent Örgryte IS, IFK Norrköping, Waterschei, and Helsingborgs IF before retiring at Ängelholms FF in 1986. A full international between 1977 and 1980, he won six caps for the Sweden national team.

Club career

Early career 
Ohlsson started off his footballing career with Varbergs BoIS and made his senior debut for the team at the age of 16 and helped the team win the 1970 Division 3 Sydvästra Götaland title and win promotion to Division 2. After two seasons with Varbergs BoIS, Ohlsson signed with the Allsvenskan club Örgryte IS in 1972 with which he spent two seasons. In 1974, he signed with IFK Norrköping where he played for five years, including at the 1978–79 UEFA Cup.

Waterschei 
He was signed by the Belgian club Waterschei in 1979, and spent two seasons playing in the Belgian First Division A and helped the club win the 1979–80 Belgian Cup. He also represented the club in the UEFA Cup as well as the UEFA Cup Winners' Cup.

Return to Sweden and retirement 
Ohlsson returned to Sweden in 1981 to sign for Helsingborgs IF, and was named the club's player of the year in 1984 (Årets HIF:are). He then retired at Ängelholms FF in 1986.

International career

Youth 
Ohlsson played six games for the Sweden U19 team between 1971 and 1972 before making his debut for the Sweden U21 team in 1972. He would go on to score 12 goals for the U21 team, which puts him at a joint-third place for most goals scored for the team behind Ola Toivonen and Carlos Standberg (both at 13 goals).

Senior 
Ohlsson made his full international debut for Sweden on 5 October 1977 in a friendly game against Denmark, in which he played for 69 minutes before being replaced by Johny Erlandsson in a 1–0 win. He made his competitive debut for Sweden on 10 October 1979 in a UEFA Euro 1980 qualifying game against Czechoslovakia, playing for 73 minutes before being replaced by Anders Grönhagen in a 1–4 loss. He won his sixth and final cap in a 1982 FIFA World Cup qualifier against Israel, playing the full 90 minutes alongside Ralf Edström at forward in a 0–0 draw.

Ohlsson also appeared once for the Sweden B team in 1978.

Personal life 
After his footballing career Ohlsson has worked as a vice-principal at an elementary school outside of Höganäs, Sweden.

Career statistics

International

Honours 
Varbergs BoIS

 Division 3 Sydvästra Götaland: 1970

Waterschei

 Belgian Cup: 1979–80
Individual
 Årets HIF:are (Helsingborgs IF player of the year): 1984

References 

Living people
1954 births
Swedish footballers
Allsvenskan players
Sweden international footballers
IFK Norrköping players
Örgryte IS players
Varbergs BoIS players
Helsingborgs IF players
Ängelholms FF players
Association football forwards
K. Waterschei S.V. Thor Genk players
People from Varberg
Sportspeople from Halland County